City View Center is a power center in Garfield Heights, Ohio. It held big-box stores such as Walmart, Giant Eagle, Circuit City (later Bottom Dollar), PetSmart, Jo-Ann Fabrics, Dick's Sporting Goods, Bed Bath & Beyond, OfficeMax, and Marshall's

The shopping center was later considered a dead mall, after issues related to a landfill underlying the site began to affect the structural integrity of some buildings.

The power center was also intended to have a second wave of store construction, possibly located down the unused portion of Transportation Boulevard (past the second entrance of City View Center via Transportation Blvd.). Those 'future' tenants included a Home Depot, JCPenney, Panera Bread, Chick-Fil-A, Buffalo Wild Wings, Dollar Tree (next to PetSmart), and a dental clinic. However, all of those stores have backed out of the project. The shopping center was redeveloped by 2021.

History

Opening
The shopping center opened in 2006, after two years of construction. After the big-box stores opened, construction began outside the main plaza for additional restaurants and retail, such as Radio Shack, Applebee's, Steak n Shake, Ruby Tuesday, and FirstMerit.

Decline
The first store to close was Jo-Ann Fabrics, on April 23, 2008. On September 15, 2008, Walmart Stores Inc. announced that it would be closing the Garfield Heights Wal-Mart store permanently because of ongoing safety concerns at the site, including structural problems and potentially explosive methane gas related to the disused landfill beneath the site. After Walmart's closure, on October 2, 2008, PetSmart announced that they would be also closing their store after complaining that its lease terms were violated because Home Depot, never opened. Shortly after, the Circuit City store closed on December 31, 2008. The Circuit City space was converted into a Bottom Dollar. In late 2009, Bed Bath And Beyond closed. On January 2, 2010, Dick's Sporting Goods closed two months shy before its four year run prior to the store's opening day. In March 2010, plans to convert the former Wal-Mart into a convention center were canceled. Bottom Dollar closed on November 11, 2010, one month shy before the store reached one year of operation. In December 2010, A.J. Wright's parent company, TJX, announced that they will rebrand most of their A.J. Wright stores to either a HomeGoods, T.J. Maxx or Marshalls. Marshalls opened in the former A.J. Wright in 2011, but closed just two years later in 2013. The second to last tenant, OfficeMax, announced that they would be closing their store by November 14, 2015. As of 2022, Giant Eagle is the only remaining store in the Transportation Boulevard complex. Applebee's also remains open.

Reuse plans
As of February 2018, empty buildings on the site were being considered as replacement facilities for Garfield Heights' police department, court, and jail.

In May 2019, the then-owner of the site, City View LLC, failed to pay back an $81 million loan, and the site was placed into receivership.

In April 2020, the mortgage on property was acquired by Industrial Commercial Properties, LLC, which planned to redevelop the site as a business park. The redevelopment was completed in 2021.

References

External links 
 

2006 establishments in Ohio
Defunct shopping malls in the United States
Former landfills in the United States
Garfield Heights, Ohio
Shopping malls disestablished in 2010
Shopping malls established in 2006